Chris Evert defeated Olga Morozova in the final, 6–1, 6–2 to win the women's singles tennis title at the 1974 French Open. It was her first major singles title, the first of an eventual record seven French Open singles titles, and the first of an eventual 18 major singles titles.

Margaret Court was the reigning champion, but chose not to defend her title.

Seeds
The seeded players are listed below. Chris Evert is the champion; others show the round in which they were eliminated.

 Chris Evert (champion)
 Virginia Wade (second round)
 Olga Morozova (finalist)
 Helga Masthoff (semifinals)
 Pat Pretorius Walkden Withdrew
 Martina Navrátilová (quarterfinals)
 Kazuko Sawamatsu (first round)
 Julie Heldman (quarterfinals)

Qualifying

Draw

Key
 Q = Qualifier
 WC = Wild card
 LL = Lucky loser
 r = Retired

Finals

Earlier rounds

Section 1

Section 2

Section 3

Section 4

References

External links
1974 French Open – Women's draws and results at the International Tennis Federation

Women's Singles
French Open by year – Women's singles
French Open - Women's Singles
1974 in women's tennis
1974 in French women's sport